In enzymology, a glutathione—homocystine transhydrogenase is an enzyme that catalyzes the chemical reaction

2 glutathione + homocystine  glutathione disulfide + 2 homocysteine

Thus, the two substrates of this enzyme are glutathione and homocystine, whereas its two products are glutathione disulfide and homocysteine.

This enzyme belongs to the family of oxidoreductases, specifically those acting on a sulfur group of donors with a disulfide as acceptor.  The systematic name of this enzyme class is glutathione:homocystine oxidoreductase. This enzyme participates in methionine metabolism and glutathione metabolism.

References 

 

EC 1.8.4
Enzymes of unknown structure